Fumed silica (CAS number 112945-52-5), also known as pyrogenic silica because it is produced in a flame, consists of microscopic droplets of amorphous silica fused into branched, chainlike, three-dimensional secondary particles which then agglomerate into tertiary particles.  The resulting powder has an extremely low bulk density and high surface area.  Its three-dimensional structure results in viscosity-increasing, thixotropic behavior when used as a thickener or reinforcing filler.

Properties 

Fumed silica has a very strong thickening effect. Primary particle size is 5–50 nm. The particles are non-porous and have a surface area of 50–600 m2/g. The density is 160–190 kg/m3.

Production 

Fumed silica is made from flame pyrolysis of silicon tetrachloride or from quartz sand vaporized in a 3000 °C electric arc. Major global producers are Evonik (who sells it under the name Aerosil), Cabot Corporation (Cab-O-Sil), Wacker Chemie (HDK), Dow Corning, Heraeus (Zandosil), Tokuyama Corporation (Reolosil), OCI (Konasil), Orisil (Orisil) and Xunyuchem(XYSIL).

Applications 

Fumed silica serves as a universal thickening agent and an anticaking agent (free-flow agent) in powders.  Like silica gel, it serves as a desiccant.  It is used in cosmetics for its light-diffusing properties. It is used as a light abrasive, in products like toothpaste. Other uses include filler in silicone elastomer and viscosity adjustment in paints, coatings, printing inks, adhesives and unsaturated polyester resins.

Health issues 

Fumed silica is not listed as a carcinogen by OSHA, IARC, or NTP. Due to its fineness and thinness, fumed silica can easily become airborne, making it an inhalation risk, capable of causing irritation.

See also 
 Hydrophobic silica
 Precipitated silica
Nanoparticles

References 

Ceramic materials
Glass types
Edible thickening agents
Silicon dioxide